Wackerman is a surname. Notable people with the surname include:

Brooks Wackerman (born 1977), American musician and songwriter
Chad Wackerman (born 1960), American musician